Thokchom Umapati Devi (born 10 March 1994) is an Indian footballer who plays as a defender for Gokulam Kerala FC. She has been a member of the India women's national team.

Honours

India
 SAFF Women's Championship: 2014, 2016
 South Asian Games Gold medal: 2016

Eastern Sporting Union
 Indian Women's League: 2016–17

Gokulam Kerala
Indian Women's League: 2019–20

Manipur
 Senior Women's National Football Championship: 2019–20

Individual
 Indian Women's League Most Valuable Player: 2016–17

References

1994 births
Footballers from Manipur
Living people
India women's international footballers
Indian women's footballers
People from Imphal
Sportswomen from Manipur
Women's association football defenders
Footballers at the 2014 Asian Games
Asian Games competitors for India
Eastern Sporting Union players
Gokulam Kerala FC Women players
Indian Women's League players
South Asian Games gold medalists for India
South Asian Games medalists in football